The Catandungan Festival is a festival held each year in Virac, Catanduanes, Philippines, every third weekend of October nearest October 24, which is when Catanduanes was founded as a province, independent from Albay.

Events
The Festival features the "Pantomina Catanduanes", a colorful street dance competition during the festival period. Pantomina is a popular dance not just in the province but also to the whole provinces of Bicol region. Its movements are intended to be reminiscent of a mating dance between a rooster and hen.

See also
Virac, Catanduanes
Catanduanes
Abaca Festival

References

External links
Catanduanes Province Official Website

Festivals in the Philippines
Festivals in Bicol Region
Cultural festivals in the Philippines
Culture of Catanduanes